The fourth All-Africa Games were held in August 1987 in Nairobi, Kenya.

Four new events were added to the games these were the women's 3000 metres, 10000 metres, 400 metres hurdles and 5000 metres track walk.  Additionally the pentathlon for women was replaced with the heptathlon.  Also four nations won medals for the first time in athletics at the All-Africa Games. These were Mauritius, Rwanda, Burundi and Madagascar

Medal summary

Men's events

Women's events

Medal table

See also
1987 in athletics (track and field)

References
GBR Athletics

 
Athletics
1987
1987 All-Africa Games
All-Africa Games
1987 in Kenya